Singra is an upazila of Natore District in the Division of Rajshahi, Bangladesh.

History
The area was governed by the Zamindars of Bengal and Natore, under the Rajshahi Raj family and the Dighapatia Raj families from the 1700s to the mid-1800s, and then under the Singranatore family from the late 1800s till 1951 when the Zamindari system was abolished by Pakistan.

Geography
It has 52851 households and total area 528.46 km2.

Singra, with an area of 528.46 km2, is bounded by Nandigram upazila (Bogura) on the north, Gurudaspur upazila on the south, Tarash (Sirajganj) and Sherpur (Bogra) upazilas on the east, Natore Sadar, Atrai and Raninagar upazilas on the west.

Demographics
According to the 2001 Bangladesh census, Singra upazila had a population of 3,20,818; male constituted 165673 of the population, females 155145; Muslims 289187, Hindus 30877, Buddhists 275, and others 478. Indigenous community such as santal belongs to this upazila.

As of the 1991 Bangladesh census, Singra had a population of 289952. Males constituted 51.29% of the population, and females 48.71%. This Upazila's eighteen up population is 139625. Singra had an average literacy rate of 25.2% (7+ years), and the national average of 32.4% literate.

Administration
Singra thana was established in 1869 and was turned into an upazila in 1983.

Singra Upazila is divided into Singra Municipality and 12 union parishads: Chamari, Chhatardighi, Chaugram, Dahia, Hatiandaha, Italy, Kalam, Lalore, Ramanandakhajura, Sherkole, Tajpur, and Sukash. The union parishads are subdivided into 446 mauzas and 424 villages.

Singra Municipality is subdivided into 12 wards and 33 mahallas.
                                                                                                                                                                                                                                                                                                                                                                                                                                                                                                                                                                                                                                               
The area of the town is 11.70 km2. The town has a population of 22517; male 50.54%, female 49.46%.  The town has one dakbungalow.

Marks of the War of Liberation Mass grave 1 (Kumarpara).

Population: About four lacs; male 51.29%, female 48.71%; Muslim 87.59%, Hindu 11.46% and others 0.95%; ethnic national: Santal.

Religious institutions: Mosque 417, temple 75, church 2, tomb 4. 
Literacy and educational institutions: Average literacy 36.73%; male 45% and female 35%.

See also
Upazilas of Bangladesh
Districts of Bangladesh
Divisions of Bangladesh

Album

References

Upazilas of Natore District